Events in the year 1995 in Brazil.

Incumbents

Federal government
 President: Fernando Henrique Cardoso
 Vice President: Marco Maciel

Governors 
 Acre: Orleir Messias Cameli (from 1 January)
 Alagoas: Geraldo Bulhões (until 1 January); Divaldo Suruagy (from 1 January)
 Amapa: João Capiberibe (from 1 January)
 Amazonas: Gilberto Mestrinho (until 1 January); Amazonino Mendes (from 1 January)
 Bahia: Paulo Souto
 Ceará: Francisco Aguiar (until 1 January); Tasso Jereissati (from 1 January)
 Espírito Santo: Albuíno Cunha de Azeredo (until 1 January); Vitor Buaiz (from 1 January)
 Goiás: Agenor Rezende (until 1 January); Maguito Vilela (from 1 January)
 Maranhão: José de Ribamar Fiquene (until 1 January); Roseana Sarney (from 1 January)
 Mato Grosso: Dante de Oliveira
 Mato Grosso do Sul: Wilson Barbosa Martins (from 1 January)
 Minas Gerais: Hélio Garcia (until 1 January); Eduardo Brandão Azeredo (from 1 January)
 Pará: Carlos Santos (until 1 January); Almir Gabriel (from 1 January)
 Paraíba: 
 until 1 January: Cícero de Lucena
 1 January-16 September: Antônio Mariz
 starting 16 September: José Maranhão 
 Paraná: Mario Pereira then Jaime Lerner 
 Pernambuco: Joaquim Francisco Cavalcanti (until 1 January); Miguel Arraes (from 1 January) 
 Piauí: Guilherme Melo (until 1 January); Mão Santa (from 1 January)
 Rio de Janeiro: Nilo Batista (until 1 January), Marcello Alencar (from 1 January)
 Rio Grande do Norte: Vivaldo Costa (until 1 January); Garibaldi Alves Filho (from 1 January)
 Rio Grande do Sul: Alceu de Deus Collares (until 1 January); Antônio Britto (from 1 January)
 Rondônia: Oswaldo Piana Filho (until 1 January); Valdir Raupp de Mattos (from 1 January)
 Roraima: Ottomar de Sousa Pinto (until 1 January); Neudo Ribeiro Campos (from 1 January)
 Santa Catarina: Antônio Carlos Konder Reis (until 1 January); Paulo Afonso Vieira (from 1 January)
 São Paulo: Luís Antônio Fleury Filho (until 1 January); Mário Covas (from 1 January)
 Sergipe: João Alves Filho (until 1 January); Albano Franco (from 1 January)
 Tocantins: José Wilson Siqueira Campos (from 1 January)

Vice governors
 Acre: Labib Murad (from 1 January)
 Alagoas: Francisco Roberto Holanda de Melo (until 1 January); Manuel Gomes de Barros (from 1 January)
 Amapá: Ronaldo Pinheiro Borges (until 1 January); Antônio Hildegardo Gomes de Alencar (from 1 January)
 Amazonas: Francisco Garcia Rodrigues (until 1 January); Alfredo Pereira do Nascimento (from 1 January)
 Bahia: Rosalvo Barbosa Romeo (until 1 January); César Borges (from 1 January)
 Ceará: Lúcio Gonçalo de Alcântara (until 1 January); Moroni Bing Torgan (from 1 January)
 Espírito Santo: Adelson Antônio Salvador (until 1 January); José Renato Casagrande (from 1 January)
 Goiás: Naphtali Alves de Souza (from 1 January)
 Maranhão: José Reinaldo Carneiro Tavares (from 1 January)
 Mato Grosso: Osvaldo Roberto Sobrinho (until 1 January); José Márcio Panoff de Lacerda (from 1 January)
 Mato Grosso do Sul: Ary Rigo (until 1 January); Braz Melo (from 1 January)
 Minas Gerais: Arlindo Porto Neto (until 1 January); Walfrido Silvino dos Mares Guia Neto (from 1 January)
 Pará: Hélio Mota Gueiros Júnior (from 1 January)
 Paraíba: José Maranhão (1 January-16 September), vacant thereafter (from 16 September)
 Paraná: Emília de Sales Belinati 
 Pernambuco: Carlos Roberto Guerra Fontes (until 1 January); Jorge José Gomes (from 1 January)
 Piauí: Osmar Antônio de Araújo 
 Rio de Janeiro: Luiz Paulo Corrêa da Rocha (from 1 January)
 Rio Grande do Norte: vacant (until 1 January); Fernando Freire (from 1 January)
 Rio Grande do Sul: João Gilberto Lucas Coelho (until 1 January); Vicente Joaquim Bogo (from 1 January)
 Rondônia: Assis Canuto (until 1 January); Aparício Carvalho de Moraes (from 1 January)
 Roraima: Antônio Airton Oliveira Dias (until 1 January); Airton Antonio Soligo (from 1 January)
 Santa Catarina: José Augusto Hülse (from 1 January)
 São Paulo: Aloysio Nunes (until 1 January); Geraldo Alckmin (from 1 January)
 Sergipe: José Carlos Mesquita Teixeira (until 1 January); José Carlos Machado (from 1 January)
 Tocantins: Paulo Sidnei Antunes (until 1 January); Raimundo Nonato Pires dos Santos (from 1 January)

Events

Births
February 8 - Ghilherme Lobo, actor
November 20 - Christian Lindell, tennis player

Deaths

See also 
1995 in Brazilian football
1995 in Brazilian television

References

 
1990s in Brazil
Years of the 20th century in Brazil
Brazil
Brazil